Route 977, or Highway 977, may refer to:

Israel
 Israel Route 977

United Kingdom
 A977 road

United States